Maximum Overload is the sixth studio album by British power metal band DragonForce, which was released in Europe on 18 August 2014, and in North America the next day. Trivium vocalist Matt Heafy contributed backing vocals on three songs, including the album's first single, "The Game". The album was produced by Jens Bogren, marking the first time the band decided not to record in their own studio and with an outside producer. The album was released in three versions: standard physical or digital CD, special edition physical or digital CD (with five bonus tracks and a bonus DVD), and vinyl.

It is also the last DragonForce album to feature drummer Dave Mackintosh, who announced his departure from the band on 3 June 2014, and was subsequently replaced by Gee Anzalone.

Concept and recording 
The album saw guitarist Sam Totman co-writing songs with bassist Frédéric Leclercq who, due to his thrash and prog tastes, expects the album to sound "a bit more diverse".

Guitarist Herman Li explained that the album's title and artwork were inspired by "the constant bombardment of information we are subjected to during our daily lives":

Totman said it also reflected the musical direction of the album:

Song information 
On 18 June 2014, German label Ear Music released the official video of the opening track "The Game" which featured new drummer, Gee Anzalone, as Dave Mackintosh had departed before the video was made. The song also features Heafy's vocals. Herman Li recorded the solos of both this song and "City of Gold" aboard Zoltan Bathory's yacht, off the coast of Los Angeles. Inspired by Sepultura's Beneath the Remains and Slayer's Reign in Blood, "The Game" is the fastest song ever performed by the band at 240 bpm, a record they had already broken in the previous album with "Fallen World".

According to Herman Li, after recording numerous takes for the "Three Hammers" solo, he couldn't decide which one to use. Because his dog always reacted with a "cute face" to the pitch bending "Whammy effect", Li had his pet listen to all takes and picked the one which made her do the cutest face.

"Defenders", which also features Heafy on backing vocals, was the second single and the first song to be revealed via a demo version released via a video uploaded to DragonForce's official channel on 31 March 2014. The official version of the song was premiered at Loudwires website on 16 June 2014. The newer version was also released as a single on the day after, on iTunes. According to Herman Li, "Defenders" was one of the first songs from the album to be finished. He also explained that the idea for the song "was to create a contrast, by fusing some thrash metal style riffs with DragonForce's big epic choruses and high-speed twin guitars solos. Our friend Matt Heafy from Trivium helped us out with some aggressive backing vocals in the pre-choruses. In terms of lyrics, here we went for our classic fantasy approach similar to our first album."

The album features a cover of Johnny Cash's "Ring of Fire", which premiered at The A.V. Club on 6 August 2014. According to Totman:

The band has announced it as their first released cover, although they have re-recorded songs made by Totman under the name Shadow Warriors; "Strike of the Ninja" ("Feel the Fire") on 2008's Ultra Beatdown and "Power of the Ninja Sword" in their 2012 album The Power Within. Maximum Overload itself features a third Shadow Warriors re-recording: "Fight to Be Free", available as a deluxe edition bonus track.

The bonus track "Galactic Astro Domination" is a remix of a short instrumental song originally recorded by DragonForce for a Capital One commercial featured on YouTube. In the video, guitarists Herman Li and Sam Totman are performing the song on an asteroid in space while using Capital One's Mobile Banking App.

Track listing 
The special edition physical copy of the album contained a bonus DVD with a documentary on the making of the album, A New Found Force, as well as a live performance of the song Cry Thunder, from their previous album The Power Within, at the Loud Park 2012 festival.

Notes
"Fight to Be Free" is a re-recording of a song titled "Fight for Be Free" (sic), recorded by Totman and ZP Theart under the name Shadow Warriors.

Personnel
 Marc Hudson – lead and backing vocals
 Herman Li – guitars, backing vocals
 Sam Totman – guitars, backing vocals
* Dave Mackintosh – drums, percussion, backing vocals 
 Vadim Pruzhanov – keyboards, synthesizer, piano, backing vocals
 Frédéric Leclercq – bass guitar, guitars, backing vocals, guitar solos on  "The Sun is Dead" and "Summer's End"

Additional musicians
 Matt Heafy – guest vocals on "Defenders", "No More" and "The Game"
 Clive Nolan – backing vocals
 Emily Ovenden – backing vocals

Charts

References 

2014 albums
DragonForce albums
Metal Blade Records albums
Albums produced by Jens Bogren